Dias d'Ávila is a municipality in the state of Bahia in the North-East region of Brazil. Its population in 2020 was 82,432.

See also
List of municipalities in Bahia

References

Municipalities in Bahia